Colleen Mulvihill (June 9, 1952 – March 2, 2019) was an American gymnast. She competed in six events at the 1968 Summer Olympics.

References

External links
 

1952 births
2019 deaths
American female artistic gymnasts
Olympic gymnasts of the United States
Gymnasts at the 1968 Summer Olympics
People from Merrill, Wisconsin
Sportspeople from Wisconsin
21st-century American women